This is a list of episodes of the Dirty Pair anime series by Sunrise based on the light novels by Haruka Takachiho. The original series ran from July 15 to December 26, 1985.

Series overview

Original anime

Television series (1985)

With Love from the Lovely Angels OVAs (1987)
These did not originally air on television. They were produced in 1986 and were released as a two episode OVA titled Dirty Pair: With Love From the Lovely Angels.

Dirty Pair 2 OVA series (1987–1988)
The 10-episode OVA series, also titled Dirty Pair 2. The opening theme song of the series is "By Yourself" by Miho Morikawa and the ending theme song is "Aki Kara no Summertime" (Summertime from Autumn) by Yuko Nitou.

References

Dirty Pair
Dirty Pair